Bridge Street Bridge may refer to:

 Bridge Street Bridge (Newark)
 Bridge Street Bridge (Trenton)
 Bridge Street Bridge (Connecticut River)
 Bridge Street Bridge (Elkhart, Indiana)
 Bridge Street Bridge (Portland, Michigan)
 Victoria Bridge, Montreal, the bridge at the base of Bridge Street